Martin Pedersen may refer to:

 Martin Pedersen (footballer) (born 1983), Danish footballer
 Martin Pedersen (cyclist) (born 1983), Danish road cyclist
 Martin Pedersen (tennis) (born 1987), Danish tennis player
 Martin Pedersen (cricketer) (born 1988), Danish cricketer
 Martin Pedersen, vocalist for Visceral Bleeding